Namibia is a country of origin, transit, and destination for foreign and Namibian women and children, and possibly for men subjected to trafficking in persons, specifically conditions of forced labor and forced prostitution. Traffickers exploit Namibian children, as well as children from Angola and Zambia, through forced labor in agriculture, cattle herding, involuntary domestic servitude, charcoal production, and commercial sexual exploitation. In some cases, Namibian parents unwittingly sell their children to traffickers. Reports indicate that vulnerable Namibian children are recruited for forced prostitution in Angola and South Africa, typically by truck drivers. There is also some evidence that traffickers move Namibian women to South Africa and South African women to Namibia to be exploited in forced prostitution. Namibian women and children, including orphans, from rural areas are the most vulnerable to trafficking. Victims are lured by traffickers to urban centers and commercial farms with promises of legitimate work for good wages they may never receive. Some adults subject children to whom they are distantly related to forced labor or commercial sexual exploitation. Small business owners and farmers may also participate in trafficking crimes against women or children. Victims are forced to work long hours to carry out hazardous tasks, and may be beaten or raped by traffickers or third parties.

The Government of Namibia does not fully comply with the minimum standards for the elimination of trafficking; however, it is making significant efforts to do so. During the year, the government created a national database on gender-based violence which will include statistics of trafficking and child labor victims, cooperated in a baseline study to assess the scope and scale of its trafficking in persons problem, investigated child labor cases, rescued child victims of labor trafficking, and began renovating buildings to use as shelters for trafficking victims. No suspected trafficking offenders, however, were prosecuted, and traffickers involved in cases of forced child labor received insufficient civil punishments. U.S. State Department's Office to Monitor and Combat Trafficking in Persons placed the country in "Tier 2"  in 2017.

Prosecution
The Government of Namibia modestly increased its anti-trafficking law enforcement efforts during the year. National police and the Ministry of Justice handled no trafficking cases during the reporting period. In May 2009, the government enacted the Prevention of Organized Crime Act (POCA) of 2004, which explicitly criminalizes all forms of trafficking. Under the POCA, persons who participate in trafficking offenses or aid and abet trafficking offenders may be fined up to $133,000 and imprisoned for up to 50 years. The Act does not differentiate between trafficking for commercial sexual exploitation and trafficking for non-sexual purposes. In addition, Section 4 of the Labor Act of 2007 prohibits forced labor, and prescribes penalties of up to four years' imprisonment or a fine of up to $2,700, or both. Section 3 of the Labor Act prohibits various forms of exploitative child labor, prescribing penalties equal to those for other forced labor offenses. Penalties for these crimes are sufficiently stringent and commensurate with those prescribed for other serious crimes, such as rape. The draft Child Care and Protection Bill is expected to address child trafficking offenses, among other crimes. Government officials are working with the Southern African Development Community to develop model comprehensive anti-trafficking legislation which could be effectively adopted in countries throughout the region. The government neither opened a criminal investigation into any suspected trafficking offenses nor prosecuted any trafficking cases during the reporting period. Officials investigated several cases of child labor; in all instances, offenders were issued compliance orders in accordance with the 2007 Labor Act, but were not arrested or otherwise penalized. The Ministry of Labor removed 17 children found working on farms in Kavango in hazardous conditions and returned them to their parents. Police operated a toll-free hotline for the public to call in with tips on trafficking cases.

Protection
During 2009, the government increased its efforts to protect victims and ensure their access to appropriate services offered by non-governmental entities, as it continued to lack the financial resources and capacity to directly care for victims. During the reporting period, the Ministry of Labor and Social Welfare identified 17 cases of children illegally working in the charcoal industry, 88 cases of children performing hazardous labor in other work places, and 57 cases of children in forced labor. The Ministry of Gender Equality and Child Welfare (MGECW) handled three trafficking cases; the victims were Zambian boys brought into the country by a Zambian trafficker, a girl from Walvis Bay forced into prostitution by her mother, and Namibian girls from Kavango and possibly the Caprivi region trafficked to wine farms in the south for forced labor as babysitters and domestic workers. In 2009, the MGECW created a national database on gender based violence that will include statistics on trafficking and child labor victims.

The government has no specific formal procedures in place for referring trafficking victims for care, although the police are responsible for finding temporary shelter for all victims as well as medical assistance. The MGECW provided social workers to work in partnership with the police, who counsel or otherwise assist victims of violent crimes, including human trafficking. Law enforcement and other officials referred victims to NGOs and other entities that provided short-term shelter facilities. Officials were aware that the shelters are often full and cannot accommodate all victims who need assistance. Neither long-term shelter facilities nor services designed to meet the specific needs of victims of trafficking existed in Namibia. The Woman and Child Protection Unit (WACPU) of the Namibian Police Force designated examination rooms in major hospitals for treatment of victims of violent crimes that are staffed by physicians trained to deal with trauma victims, including victims of trafficking. WACPU also had referral agreements with two NGOs to provide victims of trauma with counseling and legal services that were available to trafficking victims. The government subsidized some shelter facilities for victims of gender-based violence and the worst forms of child labor which may have unknowingly aided trafficked women and children. Officials began renovating 13 government-owned buildings, one in each region, to be used as shelters for women and child victims of gender-based violence and human trafficking, but these facilities would most likely not provide services for men. The Namibian legal system provided protection to victims who wish to testify against their abusers, as well as a legal alternative to foreign victims' removal to countries where they may face hardship or retribution through provisions in other laws. Official understanding of what constitutes human trafficking remained limited, and it is possible that trafficking victims were jailed or prosecuted for violating laws related to immigration and prostitution before they were identified as victims.

Prevention
The Namibian government made efforts during the year to raise awareness of trafficking throughout the country. The government conducted a media campaign against gender-based violence and trafficking, in which it encouraged victims and members of the public to report suspected trafficking offenders and assist in investigations and prosecutions. Fewer WACPU and MGECW officials received training to identify victims of trafficking in the reporting period than in previous years. The government did not provide specific training on identifying and assisting Namibian trafficking victims overseas to diplomats, but continued to encourage them to maintain relations with NGOs that follow trafficking issues. During the year, the Ministry of Home Affairs forged a partnership with UNICEF to open offices at hospitals and deploy mobile units throughout the country to provide birth certificates for newborns and identity documents for orphans and vulnerable children. The government made no discernible efforts to reduce the demand for commercial sex acts during the reporting period.

References

Namibia
Namibia
Human rights abuses in Namibia
Crime in Namibia
Women's rights in Namibia